Roundtop Mountain is a mountain located in Greene County, New York south of Haines Falls, New York. Located to the east is High Peak and located to the northwest is Clum Hill. Roundtop Mountain drains north into Kaaterskill Creek and south into Schoharie Creek.

References

Mountains of Greene County, New York
Mountains of New York (state)